Peacock Alley is a 1930 American pre-Code musical romantic drama film directed by Marcel de Sano, and starring Mae Murray and George Barraud. The film is a remake of the 1922 silent film of the same name in which Murray also stars. Aside from Murray being cast in the lead, the remake was largely different from the 1922 silent film. While Murray's character in the 1922 film was named Cleo, she was renamed Claire Tree in this film. George Barraud replaced Monte Blue as the male lead, who is now named Clayton Stoddard.

The film was shot in black-and-white except for a two-color Technicolor sequence in which Murray tangos and impersonates both a toreador and a bull. The film's sets were designed by the art director Hervey Libbert.

Plot
The film takes place entirely in New York City, removing the Paris portion of the earlier film's plot. Rather than falling in love with a man who happens along her way, Claire is actively looking for a husband. Two possibilities present themselves: a Texan, who ultimately rejects Claire because he believes her to be immoral, and Stoddard, who agrees to marry her in the end.

Cast
 Mae Murray as Claire Tree
 George Barraud as Stoddard Clayton
 Jason Robards, Sr. as Jim Bradbury (credited as Jason Robards)
 Richard Tucker as Martin Saunders
 W.L. Thorne as Dugan 
 Phillips Smalley as Bonner
 Billy Bevan as Walter - Bell Captain
 E. H. Calvert as Paul
 Arthur Hoyt as Crosby

Production
Produced by Tiffany Pictures, the film was lavishly produced with elaborate sets despite its low budget. Murray's silent films had been very successful and she and Bob Leonard had been founding members of Tiffany. However, by the time this remake was produced Murray's marriage to Leonard had come to an end as had the fortunes of Tiffany Pictures.

The film was intended to be a comeback vehicle for Murray as her career had declined after she was unofficially blacklisted by Louis B. Mayer after she walked out on her MGM contract in 1927. Unlike the silent version, the sound remake of Peacock Alley did not boost Murray's career and earned mostly unfavorable reviews. Photoplay called the film "a sorry affair" and Murray's performance "more affected and more bee-stung of mouth than ever. You'll laugh at the drama and weep over the comedy."

Murray alleged that Tiffany Pictures' crew had damaged her career by way of their technical incompetence displayed throughout the film. Because of this, she attempted to sue the company for $1,750,000, but was unsuccessful.

See also
List of early color feature films

References

External links
 

1930 films
1930s romantic musical films
1930 romantic drama films
1930s color films
American romantic drama films
American romantic musical films
Sound film remakes of silent films
Remakes of American films
Films set in New York City
Tiffany Pictures films
American musical drama films
Films directed by Marcel De Sano
1930s English-language films
1930s American films